Fauzi Hamdan Amad (born 17 April 1943) is a Mexican lawyer and politician affiliated with the National Action Party. He is from a Lebanese father (Bater Ech-Chouf) and a Lebanese mother (Barouk). As of 2014 he served as Senator of the LVIII and LIX Legislatures of the Mexican Congress representing the Federal District and as Deputy of the LV and LVII Legislatures. He is currently rector of the Escuela Libre de Derecho

References

1943 births
Living people
Politicians from Mexico City
20th-century Mexican lawyers
Members of the Senate of the Republic (Mexico)
Members of the Chamber of Deputies (Mexico)
National Action Party (Mexico) politicians
Mexican people of Lebanese descent
21st-century Mexican politicians
Escuela Libre de Derecho alumni
Academic staff of Escuela Libre de Derecho
Heads of universities and colleges in Mexico
Academic staff of the Panamerican University
Members of the Congress of Mexico City
20th-century Mexican politicians